Nigahen: Nagina Part II is an Indian fantasy film directed by Harmesh Malhotra, released in 1989. The movie stars Sridevi, Sunny Deol, Anupam Kher, and Gulshan Grover. It is the sequel to the Sridevi-lead blockbuster Nagina.

Plot
Following the events in Nagina, Nigahen is the story of Neelam, the daughter of Rajiv and Rajni. After the tragic car accident of her parents, Neelam is raised by her grandfather Lambodar (Pran) in the city and is finally brought back to her ancestral home in the country, as a young adult (who bears a striking resemblance to her mother Rajni, also played by Sridevi). There, Neelam encounters and falls in love with Anand (Sunny Deol) who, as a child, was kidnapped by Gorakh Nath, a powerful Tantrik who is revealed to be the disciple of Bhairon Nath, who tried to reveal Rajni's identity in Nagina. Claiming to have amnesia of the events, Anand woos Neelam, and she falls in love with him. Little does Neelam know that Anand does not have amnesia and is working for Gorakh Nath: the Tantrik has set his eyes on a powerful gem (Mani), which grants the one who possesses it, great powers. The only person who knows its whereabouts is Neelam, who unbeknownst to her, was hypnotized by her late mother's Guardian Snakes into going to the old temple from the original story and locating the gem (an event witnessed by Gorakh Nath).

Ultimately, Anand inadvertently falls in love with Neelam and reveals that he is cursed by Gorakh Nath: If Gorakh Nath ever catches him, he will turn him into a snake and entrap him. — hence, Neelam will never be safe with Anand. The story culminates with Neelam inheriting the powers of her late mother. Neelam saves Anand from gorakhnath. Anand reveals his truth to Neelam. They get married. Neelam and Anand fight with and defeat Gorakh Nath once and for all and live happily ever after.

Cast

Main cast
 Sridevi as Neelam - Rajni and Rajiv's Daughter
 Sunny Deol as Anand - Neelam's love and husband
 Anupam Kher as Gorakh Nath - Bhairon's disciple

Supporting cast
 Pran as Raja sahab - Rajiv's uncle
 Anjana Mumtaz as Shanti Devi - Anand's Mother
 Gulshan Grover as Kumar - Vijaya's Son, Ajay Singh's Grandson
 Aruna Irani as Gayatri - Ajay Singh's Sister
 Jagdeep as Munshiji

Soundtrack 

The music of the film was composed Laxmikant–Pyarelal and the lyrics were penned by Anand Bakshi. The soundtrack was released in 1989 on Audio Cassette, LP & Audio Cds in T-Series, which consists of 5 songs. The full album is recorded by Anuradha Paudwal, Kavita Krishnamurthy, Mohammed Aziz and Suresh Wadkar.

References

External links
 
 Nigahen: Nagina Part II at AllMovie

1989 films
1980s Hindi-language films
Films about shapeshifting
Films directed by Harmesh Malhotra
Films scored by Laxmikant–Pyarelal
Indian fantasy films
Indian sequel films
1989 fantasy films
Films about snakes